Seyyed Hassan Eslami Ardakani (born December 23, 1960) is an Iranian philosopher and professor of ethics at the University of Religions and Denominations. He is known for his expertise on virtue ethics, environmental ethics and research ethics. Eslami is a winner of Farabi International Award for his book Human Cloning in Catholic and Islamic Perspectives.

Books
 Human Cloning in Catholic and Islamic Perspectives, University of Religions and Denominations, 2007
 Ethics of Critique, Maaref, 2004
 Muhammad: Prophet of Compassion, Khorram, 1997

See also
 Mahmoud Mar'ashi Najafi
 Ahmad Vaezi

References

External links
 Seyyed Hassan Eslami Ardakani

21st-century Iranian philosophers
Philosophy academics
Living people
1960 births
Philosophy journal editors
Philosophers of religion
Farabi International Award recipients